Nicola Davies may refer to:

Nicola Davies (author), English zoologist and writer
Nicola Davies (footballer) (born 1985), Welsh female international footballer
Nicola Davies (judge) (born 1953), judge of the High Court of England and Wales
Nicola Davies (rower) in 1999 World Rowing Championships